Nordvest-Spitsbergen National Park is located on the Norwegian arctic archipelago of Svalbard and includes parts of north-west Spitsbergen (Albert I Land and Haakon VII Land) and nearby islands such as Danes Island and Moffen. It contains, among other things, warm springs and remains of volcanoes in Bockfjorden.

History
There are remains of whaling stations and graves from the 17th century. In addition there are remains of several Arctic expeditions, for instance in Virgohamna, Danes Island, the launching point for Swedish engineer S. A. Andrée's failed 1897 attempt to reach the North Pole in a hydrogen balloon. The park was established by royal resolution on 1 June 1973.

Fauna
The park contains numerous colonies of seabirds, in addition to Svalbard reindeer and Arctic fox. It is also a hibernating area for polar bears, and walrus can be found there. About a third of the area, consisting mainly of its sea-cliffs, islands and other coastal features, has been identified as an Important Bird Area (IBA) by BirdLife International because it supports breeding populations of barnacle and brent geese, common eiders and black guillemots.

Hot springs
The Troll and Jotun hot springs in the park along the edge of the Bockfjorden are the northernmost documented terrestrial hot springs on earth at almost 80 degrees north latitude. The first documentation of these springs was in the late 1800s. Hoel and Holtedahl studied these two hot springs in some detail. They reported that the Jotun hot spring has a  temperature of 24.5°C and the Troll hot spring has a temperature of 28.3°C.

External links
 An article reporting on studies of characteristics Jotun and Troll hot springs

References

National parks of Svalbard
Protected areas established in 1973
1973 establishments in Norway
Important Bird Areas of Svalbard
Seabird colonies